Ceropegia anjanerica is a species of flowering plant in the family Apocynaceae. Flowers are 2.5-3.5 cm long, usually slightly curved and greenish yellow in color and the plants are up to 20cm high. It is endemic to the Anjaneri Hills area of Nashik district.

References 

anjanerica
Flora of India (region)
Plants described in 2006